Nick Driver is an American rock and Americana singer-songwriter, based in North Carolina.

In 2010, he released his debut solo album, Warm Is Your Color, which had a top-ten song hit on Sirius XM's The Coffee House radio station. Wildy's World stated about Warm Is Your Color that "Driver looks to bring the energy of punk to the finesse and precision of pop music." He has released several full-length albums and singles since, and his songs have been featured on the television shows Bad Girls Club: Atlanta, Kourtney and Kim Take Miami, The Real World: St. Thomas, and The Real World: Portland. On September 9, 2014, he released the EP Staring at My Ceiling in the Dark.

Driver tours and records as part of The Nick Driver Band, which has appeared at festivals such as FloydFest.

In 2011, he was nominated at the John Lennon International Songwriting Contest for folk, and in 2012, he was nominated for Humanitarian Songwriter of the Year at the Las Vegas Music Awards.

Early life, education and early career
Driver was born in Zebulon, North Carolina, where he grew up on a farm. Driver has stated that "I wanted to play music for as long as I can remember. I guess around 1999 it hit me that [making music] is what I wanted to do. I never really turned back, and I never really had a back up plan." He started a rock band in high school, before moving to Raleigh, North Carolina, to attend North Carolina University.

While a student he studied classical vocals and guitar. He also played in a number of post-hardcore punk bands, which in both 2007 and 2009 were featured on the Vans Warped Tour.

Music career

Warm Is Your Color (2010)
After playing heavy rock styles for close to a decade, Driver began writing music in a primarily acoustic style. His debut solo LP Warm Is Your Color was self-released on January 1, 2010. He toured the United States in support of the album, which had a top ten song hit on Sirius XM's The Coffeehouse, titled "Let's Stay Together."

Wildy's World gave Warm Is Your Color a positive review and 3/5 stars, calling it an "adroit turn" and stating that "turning to word-heavy light acoustic pop (ala Jason Mraz) and balladry, Driver looks to bring the energy of punk to the finesse and precision of pop music". The review praised the creativity of several songs in particular, but criticized others for not suiting Driver's style. "The more up-tempo acoustic pop songs work very well for Driver, whereas the slow ballads find Driver losing energy, focus and sound." Music Spectrum also compared Driver's style to Mraz, and stated, "Aside from the Mraz comparison, I also hear what's called Speedwood by the group Lost & Found. What they mean are some hard acoustic guitar lines—kind of a punk energy to folk music. Driver displays this on 'Young Beautiful,' with the guitar accentuated by congas."

Recent years
Driver went on to release several more solo albums after Warm Is Your Color. A Kinda Love This World Could Never Burn, his next, was released on April 12, 2011, on Talkback Records. His single off the album, "Spare Me Some Change", led to Driver being a finalist in the John Lennon Songwriting Award for Folk in 2011. Later that year, he released the EP Coffee House Hero: Live & Rare Acoustic B-Sides on Interscope Digital Distribution.

Driver self-released Poet's Corner, Vol. One on September 25, 2012. It received a positive review in Indy Week, which stated the album lacked adventure and is instead "a record of simple and openhearted tunes, and when it works, Driver offers the kind of amiable pop that Matt Nathanson would be proud to call his own, as with the endearing 'Collect the Rain'". Jonah Matranga sang backing vocals for Driver's song "Universal Love" on the album Poets' Corner Volume One in late 2012. In 2013, he independently released two albums: Folsom Prison Blues and The Nicky D LP.

Driver's songs have been featured on television shows, including Bad Girls Club: Atlanta on Oxygen Network, Kourtney and Kim Take Miami on E! Network,  The Real World: St. Thomas, and The Real World: Portland.

On September 9, 2014, he released the EP Staring at My Ceiling in the Dark.

The Nick Driver Band

Formed to record on Driver's studio albums and perform live, early on The Nick Driver Band included Driver, Darren Abbacchi, Elijah Ott, Billy Hinnant, and Jared Pyle. Other past members include Jade Werth on guitar, keyboards, and harp. In 2012, The Nick Driver Band won "Best Rock Band in the Triangle" by The Independent Weekly in Raleigh.

The band has toured extensively throughout the United States, and opened for groups such as Edward Sharpe and the Magnetic Zeros, North Mississippi All-Stars, Pat Benatar, The Lumineers, Jonas Brothers, Demi Lovato, Less Than Jake, and Creed.

The band has performed at festivals, including the Warped Tour, The American Music Festival, Celebrate Fairfax, and Floydfest 2013.

Members as of 2014
Nick Driver – vocals, guitars, songwriting
Darren Abbacchi – drums 
Mike Chidsey – lead guitar

Style
Driver uses few effects in his solo material, and mostly relies on acoustic instruments. While he incorporates the stylings of multiple genres, much of his music has an "Americana, singer-songwriter feel".

According to Driver, "Jamie King from Swift is a big influence on me and my music. He's the most talented producer I've ever worked [with]." Driver has also cited poets such as Sylvia Plath as influences on his lyrics, stating "She was intense. I make loads of sunshine type songs, but a lot of my influences have a tendency to be a little bit on the darker, edgier side of things." About his message, "I guess...I want to express that the simple things in life are the best. I want to make love and relationships sound like an interesting concept like they truly are."

Personal life
Driver is based in Raleigh.

Discography

Solo material

Albums

EPs

Singles

Further reading

See also

 List of people from North Carolina
 List of singer-songwriters

References

External links
 , his official website
 Nick Driver Band on Facebook
 Nick Driver on YouTube
 Nick Driver on Bandcamp
 Nick Driver on Flickr

Year of birth missing (living people)
20th-century births
21st-century American singers
21st-century American composers
21st-century American writers
American male singer-songwriters
American male guitarists
American rock guitarists
American rock singers
Living people
Musicians from Raleigh, North Carolina
Singer-songwriters from North Carolina
21st-century American guitarists
Guitarists from North Carolina
20th-century American guitarists
People from Zebulon, North Carolina
20th-century American male musicians
21st-century American male singers